Hibbertia decumbens is a species of flowering plant in the family Dilleniaceae and is endemic to a restricted area of New South Wales. It is a spreading, almost prostrate shrub with hairy foliage, egg-shaped to almost round leaves, and yellow flowers usually with nine to twelve stamens arranged in a group on one side of two carpels.

Description
There are usually nine to twelve stamens arranged in one group alongside the two woolly-hairy carpels, each carpel with two ovules. Flowering occurs from October to January.

Taxonomy
Hibbertia decumbens was first formally described in 1998 by Hellmut R. Toelken in the Journal of the Adelaide Botanic Gardens from specimens collected near Wentworth Falls in 1987. The specific epithet (decumbens) means prostrate, but with rising tips.

Distribution and habitat
This hibbertia grows on sandstone ledges in a few locations in the Blue Mountains.

See also
List of Hibbertia species

References

decumbens
Flora of New South Wales
Plants described in 1998
Taxa named by Hellmut R. Toelken